Arni's Restaurant is a chain of pizzerias with locations throughout the U.S. state of Indiana.

History
The first Arni's opened at Market Square Shopping Center in Lafayette, Indiana, in 1965, after its founder purchased an existing Pizza King franchise and converted it to his own namesake, and was named for its founder, restaurateur Arni Cohen.  The restaurant, originally designed to seat 120, expanded several times and now seats approximately 500.

The restaurant's success led to the establishment of several smaller Arni's locations in surrounding communities, emphasizing carryout service.  A second full-service location opened in the summer of 1988.  The chain currently consists of 10 company owned stores and eight franchised locations.

Arni Cohen was a board member of the Indiana Restaurant Association and was elected to the Indiana Restaurant Association Hall of Fame in 2002. He died February 7, 2002, at the age of 69; his sons Brad and Kurt now lead the company.

Arni's was added to the Pizza Hall of Fame on August 1, 2017.

See also

 List of pizza chains of the United States

References

Wright, Jodi. "Pie in the Sky." Indianapolis Monthly 31.12 (June 2008): 184-184.
"Restaurants Northwest." Indianapolis Monthly 28.14 (August 2005): 295–296.

External links
Official website

Restaurants established in 1965
Lafayette, Indiana
Pizza chains of the United States
Restaurants in Indiana
Regional restaurant chains in the United States
1965 establishments in Indiana